Hollywood Girls : Une nouvelle vie en Californie (A New Life in California), or simply Hollywood Girls, is a French soap opera created by Alexandre dos Santos, Jérémy Michalak, and Thibaut Vales for NRJ12. The series features an ensemble cast and follows a groups of French peoples who decided to start a new life in California, but their life is quickly disrupted by the diabolical Geny G and her husband, the Dr. David Moretti.

Filming takes place completely in Los Angeles for the first and fourth seasons, but for the rest of the show, only the outside scenes where filmed in the United States, with inside scenes filmed at a studio at Le Perray-en-Yvelines in France. All the plots of the series are written by screenwriters, but dialogues are improvised by the comedians, who are almost all former NRJ12's reality show candidates.

Hollywood Girls premiered on NRJ12 on March 12, 2012. When the series was renewed for a fourth season, it was renamed Hollywood Girls : Un nouveau départ (A New Beginning), which marks the beginning of a soft reboot with most of the main cast not returning. In April 2015, it was canceled due to the low ratings of the fourth season.

Overview 
Ayem Stevens and Caroline Vales are best friends. After a violent argument with her mother, Ayem realised that there was nothing for her in France and she decided to start a new life in California with Caroline, a woman recently separated from her fiancé who cheated on her the night before their wedding. In Los Angeles, they will find love, friendship and unexpected betrayal, with their lives changing for the better and for the worse.

Cast

Main cast

Recurring cast

Episodes

Series 1 (March 2012 - April 2012) 
 Bienvenue à Los Angeles
 Ça reste entre nous
 Elle est parfaite pour moi
 J'ai rien à faire ici
 Méfie-toi vraiment
 C'est à prendre ou à laisser
 J'ai un plan
 Je ne peux plus faire ça
 C'est soit elles, soit moi
 Je n'arrête pas de penser à lui
 Pas un mot à Sandra
 Je suis prête à tout
 C'est juste catastrophique
 J'en ai parlé à personne
 J'ai du mal à comprendre
 Tu peux pas me dire ça
 Il faudrait un miracle
 C'est fini, oublie-moi
 Je vais tout arranger
 Il est vraiment fou de toi
 J'ue chose pour toi
 J'ai un scoop énorme
 On va tout balancer
 Tout est sous contrôle
 Il faut que je parte
 Les amours impossibles

Series 2 (August 2012 - November 2012) 

 Je ne te connais pas      
 Toi aussi tu me manques  
 Laisse-lui une chance     
 Je ne fais rien de mal       
 Je n'ai rien à te dire    
 J'ai une bonne raison     
 Tu joues à quoi ?         
 Je joue un double jeu     
 Tu n'as pas le choix      
 Je te crois vraiment      
 Carpe diem                
 Je vais le détruire        
 Tu ne changeras jamais    
 J'ai tout perdu           
 C'est la guerre           
 On va les faire tomber     
 J'ai la solution           
 On repart à zéro          
 Tu es un homme mort       
 Je cherche ton frère          
 Ce n'était pas un accident 
 Il est là                 
 Tu as ma parole            
 On n'a plus rien à se dire 
 Fais attention à toi      
 Tu es en danger           
 C'est un cauchemar        
 Je ne vais pas me laisser faire 
 Ouvre les yeux            
 Qui peut t'en vouloir ?   
 Je ne veux plus te voir   
 J'ai changé               
 Pas un mot à Caro           
 J'ai tellement peur         
 Laisse mon frère tranquille 
 On est pret                
 J'aurai du t'écouter      
 Tu peux compter sur moi    
 C'est  ta dernière chance  
 Je tiens trop à toi        
 On va les doubler          
 Mission impossible         
 Tu m'as trahi              
 Comment tu peux me faire ça ? 
 Je prends ta place            
 Tu sais où me trouver         
 On n'en parle à personne      
 Je vais la détruire           
 Je ne suis pas folle          
 Je compte sur toi             
 Elle veut ma mort            
 J'ai tout entendu             
 Je te l'avais dis             
 Tu te trompes                                  
 On m'a piégé                    
 Oublie moi                    
 Rien ne pourra nous séparer   
 J'ai besoin de temps           
 Je la déteste                 
 Il faut qu'on parle           
 On avait un deal              
 Je suis au courant            
 Je t'ai menti
 C'est plus fort que moi
 Tu te voiles la face
 Il faut le coincer
 Vous m'aviez promis
 Tu m'as tout pris
 Tu n'es pas la bienvenue
 Tu es sûre de toi ?
 Il est l'heure de payer

Series 3 (November 2013 - January 2014) 

 Reviens à la vie
 Il a laissé quelque chose
 Je ne mentirai plus !
 Un nouveau secret
 Tu es vivant !
 Je ne pensais jamais te revoir
 O<n fait une trêve
 Une main tendue
 Désolée, je peux pas
 Il faut que je te dise la vérité
 Comment tu as pu me cacher ça
 La vérité, toute la vérité, rien que la vérité
 De bien belles rencontres
 Le hasard est bien fait ?
 Ce n'est pas l'envie qui manque
 Je suis sur que c'est elle
 Travaillons ensemble !
 Non mais t'es dingue ou quoi ?
 Je rentre en France !
 Je ne suis pas prête
 J'ai besoin de temps
 Merci d'être aussi franc
 Si tu lui fais le moindre mal...!
 Redeviens qui tu es
 J'ai enfin choisi
 Entre la vie et la mort
 Qui va s'occuper de moi si t'es pas là
 S'il te plaît
 L'opération de la dernière chance
 Le bout du tunnel
 C'est toi que je veux
 On ne joue pas avec les gens comme ça
 Tout est de ma faute
 Des dommages irreversibles
 Et si c'était moi la reine de la soirée
 Veux-tu être mon chef-d'oeuvre
 Ici c'est l'Amérique
 Fais le pour moi
 Promets de ne le dire à personne
 Tu m'avais fait une promesse
 Tout va bien je t'assure
 J'ai peur qu'il comprenne
 Je ne veux pas mélanger amour et carrière
 On a perdu une bataille
 J'ai toujours su que cela allait fonctionner
 Elle n'est pas si méchante
 On va régler nos compte
 Ce n'est pas moi qui tire les ficelles
 Tu nous manques
 Le grand soir
 Je veillerai sur toi
 Avoir du coeur
 Plus qu'un chapitre'''
 Elle veut ma mort J'ai gagné Series 4 (January 2015 - March 2015) 

 Amour, travail et colocation	
 Mauvaises surprises Ne jamais baisser les bras Maladresses en série	
 Happy End Fiasco sur fiasco	
 Oui !	
 Questions pour l'immigration	
 Erreurs à la chaîne Un mensonge peut en cacher un autre Rien ne va plus Le chantage Premier lapin	
 Mea culpa	
 Relooking extrême Faux semblants	
 La main dans le sac Amélie	
 En flag	
 L'incruste Le dérapage The End ? L'accident	
 Les grands changements	
 Cassiopée	
 Gossip Joyeux anniversaire Les comptes sont bons	
 Sex friends	
 Les retrouvailles Aller simple pour la France Rien à sauver	
 Le poème du siècle Vérité à la clé Le défilé Une déclaration d'amour	
 Christina Ginie s'incruste	
 Bon anniversaire Maud Les yeux fermés Une victoire aux forceps	
 L'union fait la force	
 La passion retrouvée Comme dans un film d'horreur	
 Pyjama et barbecue	
 Retour de flammes Tous ensemble	
 Jeu collectif	
 Le temps qui court Tout prêt du but Le jour J''

References

External links 
 

2010s French drama television series
French television soap operas
2012 French television series debuts
2015 French television series endings
Television shows set in Los Angeles
Television shows filmed in Los Angeles
Television shows filmed in France
French-language television shows